JMD  may refer to:

 Jamaican dollar, ISO 4217 currency code for the currency of Jamaica
 Justice Management Division of the U.S. Department of Justice